Byaheng DO30 was a Philippine television public affairs show broadcast by GMA Davao. It premiered on December 18, 2016.

Overview
The TV show captures the 30 major projects and programs Davao Mayor Sara Duterte intends to accomplish in three years—thus, DO30 (shortened version of doing 30 projects and a play on words for Sara's family name). All these projects and programs respond to the 10 priority sectors, which include poverty alleviation; infrastructure development; solid waste management; health; education; agriculture; tourism; transportation planning and traffic management; peace and order; and disaster risk and mitigation. The show also highlights and explains the ordinances of the Davao City council. It also highlights features and updates of local government units across the Davao Region.

The program marked the return of the younger Duterte on GMA, more than a year after she hosted Una Ka BAI.

On August 5, 2018, the program can be seen in other GMA Regional TV stations in Cagayan de Oro, as well as its relay stations across Mindanao including General Santos and Zamboanga.

On July 3, 2022, the succeeding Mayor of Davao City, Sebastian "Baste" Duterte, became a host for the program and succeeded his sister Sara who became the Vice President of the Philippines on June 30, 2022.

Hosts
 Jehtrond Huelar
 Kessia Tar-Amora
 Reymar Tero
 Marlo Brua
 Potpot Marañon
 Chyn Sabute

Former Hosts
 Sara Duterte (now Vice President of the Philippines)

Accolades

References

External links 
 

2016 Philippine television series debuts
2020 Philippine television series endings
GMA Network original programming
GMA Integrated News and Public Affairs shows
Philippine television shows